Saturday Playhouse was a 60-minute UK anthology television series produced by and airing on the British Broadcasting Corporation (BBC) from 4 January 1958 until 1 April 1961. There were sixty-eight episodes, among them adaptations of the plays The Man Who Came to Dinner and The Cat and the Canary. One of the episodes, Alex Atkinson’s classic thriller Design for Murder, was featured twice on the BBC: first on Saturday Playhouse (Saturday, 15 March 1958; S1/Ep.6) and again from the BBC’s own theatre in Bristol (Thursday, 6 July 1961).

Many actors performed for Saturday Playhouse, including:
Maxine Audley, 
John Barrie, 
Michael Bates, 
Brian Blessed, 
Jeremy Brett, 
Michael Crawford,
Anton Diffring,
Paul Eddington, 
Denholm Elliott, 
Thora Hird,
Desmond Llewelyn,
Margaret Lockwood,
Leo McKern, 
Bob Monkhouse, 
Leslie Phillips,
Prunella Scales and
Elizabeth Shepherd, among others.

Only a single episode is believed to have survived.

References

External links

1958 British television series debuts
1961 British television series endings
1950s British drama television series
1960s British drama television series
British drama television series
1950s British anthology television series
1960s British anthology television series
Lost BBC episodes
Black-and-white British television shows
English-language television shows